{{safesubst:#invoke:RfD||2=Baal-zebub In Rabbinical Literature|month = February
|day = 27
|year = 2023
|time = 16:09
|timestamp = 20230227160930

|content=
redirect Beelzebub#Judaism

}}